Events from the year 1989 in Denmark.

Incumbents
 Monarch - Margrethe II
 Prime minister - Poul Schlüter

Events
 26 August – Munkeruphus north of Copenhagen opens its doors to its first exhibition as an exhibition space.
 1 October – Denmark becomes the first country in the world to legalise civil partnerships for same-sex couples.
 Full date unknown:
 Tools Design, a consumer products and furniture design studio is founded.

Culture

Film
 28 January — Both Pelle the Conqueror and Babette's Feast art nominated for Best Foreign Language Film at the 46th Golden Globe Awards and Pelle the Conqueror wins the award.

Sport

 15 Mette Jacobsen wins two bronze medals in Women's 200 metre freestyle and Women's 200 metre butterfly at the 1989 European Aquatics Championships.

Cycling
 Danny Clark (AUS) and  Urs Freuler (SUI) win the Six Days of Copenhagen sox-day track cycling race.
 Danny Clark (AUS) and Jens Veggerby (DEN) win the Six Days of Copenhagen sox-day track cycling race.

Births
 14 January – Lærke Møller, handball player
 26 March – Simon Kjær, footballer
 31 May – Daniel Wass, footballer
 7 August – Søren Frederiksen, footballer
 21 December – Thorbjørn Olesen, golfer

Deaths
 3 February – Ebbe Langberg, actor (born 1933)
 29 April  Else Schøtt, operatic soprano (born 1895)
 17 May – Finn Juhl, architect and designer (born 1912)
 2 July – Hilmar Baunsgaard, politician, former Danish prime minister (born 1920)
 30 July – Lily Broberg, actress (born 1923)

See also
1989 in Danish television

References

 
Denmark
Years of the 20th century in Denmark
1980s in Denmark